This is a list of content libraries and catalogs owned by Paramount Global.

Content libraries

Paramount Pictures Corporation 

 Paramount Pictures film library (except for most of the 1929–1949 Paramount Pictures library, which is owned by numerous third-party companies with the bulk of them being owned by Universal Pictures via EMKA, Ltd., Dr. Jekyll and Mr. Hyde, owned by Warner Bros. via Turner Entertainment Co., and The Story of Temple Drake, owned by The Walt Disney Company via 20th Century Studios, as well few post-1949 Paramount Pictures films owned by third-party companies)
 Paramount Animation
 Paramount Cartoon Studios (post-1962 library)
 Melange Pictures (formerly Republic Pictures and National Telefilm Associates)
 Republic Pictures theatrical library (1935–1967)
 Most of Paramount's pre-October 1950 short-subject library, including shorts from Fleischer Studios and Famous Studios (excluding Popeye the Sailor and Superman cartoon shorts, owned by Warner Bros. via Turner Entertainment Co. and DC Entertainment; Paramount cartoon shorts from 1950–62 owned by Universal Pictures via DreamWorks Animation)
 Select films produced by Monogram Pictures and Allied Artists Productions
 Rainbow Productions
 The Enterprise Studios
 Budd Rogers Releasing Corporation
 United States Pictures (pre-1960)
 Commonwealth United Entertainment
 The Landau-Unger Company
 Most of the Astor Pictures library
 United Pictures Corporation
 Spelling Films
 Taft International Pictures film library
 Sunn Classic Pictures film library
 Television and online streaming distribution rights to the Carolco Pictures and Weintraub Entertainment Group film libraries
 pre-2011 DW Studios library
Go Fish Pictures
 Insurge Pictures
 Paramount Classics/Paramount Vantage
Paramount Digital Entertainment
Paramount Television Studios
 DreamWorks Television library (1996–2008) (except programs owned by third-parties)
 Distribution rights to Rysher Entertainment's feature films (owned by Vine Alternative Investments)
 Bing Crosby Productions' feature films (distribution)
Miramax film library  (excluding Bob Roberts and Reservoir Dogs, owned by Lionsgate via the LIVE Entertainment library, The Tempest, owned by The Walt Disney Company via the Touchstone Pictures library, Addicted to Love, owned by Warner Bros., and Shakespeare in Love, owned by Universal Pictures)
Miramax Family film library (excluding Tom and Jerry: The Movie, owned by Warner Bros. via Turner Entertainment Co., and non-Japanese distribution rights to Princess Mononoke, owned by GKIDS in North America and Wild Bunch internationally (with StudioCanal handling UK home media rights) while the film is owned and fully controlled by Studio Ghibli)
Miramax Television library
pre-2005 Dimension Films library (excluding The Amityville Horror, owned by Metro-Goldwyn-Mayer with Warner Bros. Home Entertainment handling worldwide home media rights under license on behalf of MGM)
International distribution rights to films from Samuel Goldwyn Productions (except movies in the public domain, and The Hurricane, owned by Metro-Goldwyn-Mayer)
 CBS Films
 CBS Theatrical Films
 Cinema Center Films

CBS Entertainment Group 
 CBS News and Stations
 CBS News library
 CBS News Streaming Network
 CBS Studios library
 Big Ticket Television
 CBS Productions
 CBS Eye Productions
Paramount Television (original incarnation) (1967–2006)
Desilu Productions (excluding The Ann Sothern Show)
Wilshire Court Productions
 Viacom Productions
 Terrytoons
 Viacom Pictures
 Tomorrow Entertainment catalog (post-1975) (distribution only) 
 Distribution rights to Rysher Entertainment's television programs (owned by Vine Alternative Investments, excluding the Saved by the Bell franchise, owned by Universal Television, and Sex and the City, owned by Warner Bros. via HBO Enterprises)
 Bing Crosby Productions' television programs (distribution)
 Television Program Enterprises (distribution)
 KingWorld
 Eyemark Entertainment
 Group W Productions
 InterStar Releasing

Republic Pictures Television 
 National Telefilm Associates television library
 Studio City Productions
 NBC Films (pre-1973) (excluding I Spy and The Bill Cosby Show)
 California National Productions

Spelling Television 
 Thomas-Spelling Productions
 Spelling Films
 Laurel Entertainment library
 Worldvision Enterprises library (excluding the Hanna-Barbera and pre-1991 Ruby-Spears libraries, owned by Warner Bros. via Turner Entertainment Co., Let's Make a Deal, owned by Fremantle, the Southern Star/Hanna-Barbera Australia library, owned by Endemol Shine Australia, and Worldvision's co-productions with Fries Entertainment, owned by Metro-Goldwyn-Mayer)
 ABC Films (pre-1973) (excluding series produced by Rankin/Bass Productions, owned by NBCUniversal via DreamWorks Animation and DreamWorks Classics)
 Taft Entertainment Television
 Sunn Classic Pictures television library
 QM Productions
 Titus Productions
 Black Entertainment Television LLC

Television Networks 

 Showtime Networks library
 MTV Entertainment Studios library (includes programs produced for MTV, VH1, MTV2, TV Land, and Logo)
 Comedy Partners
 Country Music Television
 Spike Cable Networks Inc.
 Pop Media Group
 Smithsonian Networks
 Nickelodeon Productions
 Noggin LLC
 Paws, Inc.
 Awesomeness

International Networks 
 Porta dos Fundos
 Telefe
TeleColombia
 Ten Network Holdings
 Chilevisión
Ananey Communications
Viacom 18 (49%) 
Colors 
Viacom18 Studios
The Indian Film Company
Voot originals library

See also 
 List of assets owned by Paramount Global
 List of Paramount Global television programs

References 

Paramount GLobal
Paramount Global-related lists